Biot's breathing or ataxic breathing, is an abnormal pattern of breathing characterized by variable tidal volume, random apneas, and no regularity. It is named for Camille Biot, who characterized it in 1876.

Causes
Biot's respiration is caused by damage to the medulla oblongata and pons due to trauma, stroke, opioid use, and increased intracranial pressure due to uncal or tentorial herniation. Often this condition is also associated with meningitis.

Diagnosis

Differential diagnosis
In common medical practice, Biot's respiration is often mistaken for Cheyne–Stokes respiration, part of which may have been caused by them both being described by the same person studying both.

References

Breathing abnormalities